In mathematics, a square-free polynomial is a polynomial defined over a field (or more generally, an integral domain) that does not have as a divisor any square of a non-constant polynomial.<ref name="yun">{{cite book |first=David Y.Y. |last=Yun |chapter=On square-free decomposition algorithms |doi=10.1145/800205.806320 |chapter-url=https://dl.acm.org/doi/10.1145/800205.806320 |title=SYMSAC '76 Proceedings of the third ACM symposium on Symbolic and algebraic computation |publisher=Association for Computing Machinery |year=1976 |isbn=978-1-4503-7790-4 |pages=26–35 |s2cid=12861227 }}</ref> A univariate polynomial is square free if and only if it has no multiple root in an algebraically closed field containing its coefficients. This motivates that, in applications in physics and engineering, a square-free polynomial is commonly called a polynomial with no repeated roots.

The converse is also true and hence,  is square-free if and only if  is a greatest common divisor of the polynomial and its derivative.

A square-free decomposition or square-free factorization of a polynomial is a factorization into powers of square-free polynomials

where those of the  that are non-constant are pairwise coprime square-free polynomials (here, two polynomials are said coprime is their greatest common divisor is a constant; in other words that is the coprimality over the field of fractions of the coefficients that is considered). Every non-zero polynomial admits a square-free factorization, which is unique up to the multiplication and division of the factors by non-zero constants. The square-free factorization is much easier to compute than the complete factorization into irreducible factors, and is thus often preferred when the complete factorization is not really needed, as for the partial fraction decomposition and the symbolic integration of rational fractions. Square-free factorization is the first step of the polynomial factorization algorithms that are implemented in computer algebra systems. Therefore, the algorithm of square-free factorization is basic in computer algebra.

Further GCD computations and exact divisions allow computing the square-free factorization (see square-free factorization over a finite field). In characteristic zero, a better algorithm is known, Yun's algorithm, which is described below. Its computational complexity is, at most, twice that of the GCD computation of the input polynomial and its derivative. More precisely, if  is the time needed to compute the GCD of two polynomials of degree  and the quotient of these polynomial by the GCD, then  is an upper bound for the time needed to compute the square free decomposition.

There are also known algorithms for the computation of the square-free decomposition of multivariate polynomials, that proceed generally by considering a multivariate polynomial as a univariate polynomial with polynomial coefficients, and applying recursively a univariate algorithm.

Yun's algorithm
This section describes Yun's algorithm for the square-free decomposition of univariate polynomials over a field of characteristic 0. It proceeds by a succession of GCD computations and exact divisions.

The input is thus a non-zero polynomial f, and the first step of the algorithm consists of computing the GCD a0 of f and its formal derivative f'''. 

If

is the desired factorization, we have thus  

and 

and

Iterating this process until   we find all the 

This is formalized into an algorithm as follows:

Square root
In general, a polynomial has no square root. More precisely, most polynomials cannot be written as the square of another polynomial.

A polynomial has a square root if and only if all exponents of the square-free decomposition are even. In this case, a square root is obtained by dividing these exponents by 2.

Thus the problem of deciding if a polynomial has a square root, and of computing it if it exists, is a special case of square-free factorization.

Notes

References

Polynomials
Computer algebra
Polynomials factorization algorithms